Alys of France, Countess of Vexin (4 October 1160 – c. 1220), known in English as "Alice", was a French princess, the daughter of Louis VII, King of France and his second wife, Constance of Castile.

Life 
Alys was the half-sister of Marie and Alix of France, Louis's children by Eleanor of Aquitaine, and the younger sister of Margaret of France. Just five weeks after Constance died giving birth to Alys, Louis married Adèle of Champagne, by whom he had two further children, including the future King Philip II of France.

In January 1169, Louis and King Henry II of England signed a contract for the marriage between Alys and Henry's son Richard the Lionheart. The 8-year-old Alys was then sent to England as Henry's ward.

In 1177, Cardinal Peter of Saint Chrysogonus, on behalf of Pope Alexander III, threatened to place England's continental possessions under an interdict if Henry did not proceed with the marriage. There were widespread rumors that Henry had not only made Alys his mistress, but that she had a child with him. Henry died in 1189. King Richard married Berengaria of Navarre on 12 May 1191, while still officially engaged to Alys.

Philip had offered Alys to Prince John, but Eleanor prevented the match. Alys married William IV Talvas, Count of Ponthieu, on 20 August 1195. They had two daughters: Marie, Countess of Ponthieu, and Isabelle; and a stillborn son named Jean.

See also
Cultural depictions of Alys of France

References

Sources
Churchill, Winston. A History of the English Speaking People.
Poole, A.L. Domesday Book to Magna Carta.
Ralph of Diceto
Roger of Hovedon
Benedict of Peterborough
Gerald of Wales

Vexin, Alys, Countess of
Mistresses of Henry II of England
House of Capet
Vexin, Alys, Countess of
Vexin, Alys, Countess of
Year of death uncertain
12th-century English women
12th-century English people
12th-century French women
12th-century French people
13th-century French women
13th-century English women
13th-century English people
Daughters of kings